Sundargadi Odia or Northwestern Odia is a dialect of the Odia language spoken in the Sundergarh district and parts of adjoining districts of Odisha. It is also spoken in the nearby districts of Jashpur of Chhattisgarh and Simdega of Jharkhand.

Characteristics
The Sundargadi variety is influenced by Sambalpuri to the south along with influences from the Sadri and Chhattisgarhi languages due to the geographical location of the Northwestern region of Odisha bordering the adjoining linguistic regions of Jharkhand and Chhattisgarh. The features of the variety are as follows(Sundargadi following Standard Odia):

Word Final Vowel Deletion (Schwa deletion)
Eg.- In this Genitive case, ଲୋକର (lokara) - ଲୋକର୍ (lokar)

Some phonetic shifts- 'o' to 'a', 'l' to 'n', medial 'ḍa' to 'ṛa'
Eg.- to me- ମୋତେ (mote) - ମତେ (mate), he had got- ପାଇଲେ (pāile) - ପାଇନେ (pāine), did- କଲି (kali) - କନିଁ (kanĩ), great- ବଡ (ḍa) - ବଡ଼ (baṛa)

case variations
Dative- 'ki' instead of 'ku', what- କାହିଁକି (kāhĩki)

Locative- 'ra' instead of 're', in answer- ଜବାବର (jabābra), in the forest- ବଣର (baṇara)

Genitive (Pronoun)- your- ତୋର (tora) - ତୋହୋର୍ (tohor)

References

Further reading 
 

Eastern Indo-Aryan languages
Languages of Odisha
Odia language